The British Rail Class 507 is a type of electric multiple unit (EMU) passenger train built by British Rail Engineering Limited at Holgate Road carriage works in two batches from 1978 to 1980. They were the second variety of British Rail's standard 1972 design for suburban EMUs derived from PEP stock, which eventually encompassed 755 vehicles over five classes (313, 314, 315, 507 and 508). They have worked on the Merseyrail network from new and continue to do so, having been refurbished by Alstom's Eastleigh Works. The Class 507 units are all now  or more years old.

History
With the Class 502 units life-expired, unable to cope with the demands of the new Link tunnel and approaching 40years old, by 1977 a replacement was sought. Owing to the success of the Class 313 fleet on suburban services from King's Cross, four sets were temporarily transferred to Merseyside and based at Hall Road TMD. Sets 313013/063 were used for clearance trials on the Southport, Ormskirk and Kirkby-Garston lines. The results showed that a similar type of stock would be suitable for the Merseyrail Northern Line.

Initially, 47 sets were ordered (507001-507047) but cost issues forced this number to be reduced to 38 units, then 30 by early 1978 when the first sets were under construction. Ultimately, 33 units were built between September 1978 and October 1979.
The first set was delivered to Birkenhead North depot during September 1978, with the first test run taking place on 9 October 1978.

On 25 October 1978, a Royal Special involving units 507001 and 507002 conveyed The Queen and several other VIPs on a special service between Moorfields and Kirkby. Following the journey, she declared the new-look Merseyrail network officially open. The first passenger working occurred on 1 November 1978, with unit 507001 working the 07:39 Southport-Liverpool Central with a commemorative headboard. It worked between Liverpool and Southport for the remainder of the day, while unit 507002 operated between Liverpool and Ormskirk. Further Class 507 units steadily entered service and the Class 502 was, in turn, withdrawn. By mid-1980, Northern Line services were entirely in the hands of the Class 507 and all of the sets were in service by October 1980. A host of new liveries appeared following sectorisation of British Rail.

Following privatisation, the Class 507 units were used interchangeably between both the Northern Line and the Wirral Line, working a further four routes regularly. The remaining 32 units were refurbished by Alstom Eastleigh during 2002–2005. They received new interiors, CCTV, light clusters dot matrix displays and the 2+3 seating was replaced with 2+2 seats. Unit 507033 was the last Merseyside set to be refurbished, entering service having been named Cllr George Howard in August 2005.

Incidents
Unit 507022 was written off as a result of a serious collision with unit 507004 at Kirkdale TMD on 30 September 1991. Driving motor 64388 is now in unit 507004, as the latter's was damaged beyond repair, and the other motor carriage, renumbered, went to Glasgow-based 314203.

Collisions with buffer stops at terminal stations have also occurred. Sets 507029 and 507032 both received damage due to overrunning at Kirkby in 1991 and 1997 respectively. Set 507019 was involved in a collision at West Kirby on 11 January 2007, and carriage 64423 had to be sent to Crewe Works for repair.

On 30 June 2009, unit 507002 without a driver rolled out of Kirkdale TMD, derailing at a set of points further down. The incident, which caused disruption to many services, was caused by failure to apply the brakes, whilst maintenance was performed so that when isolating wooden paddles were removed from between the conductor rail and pick-up shoes, the train moved off without a driver on board.  On 23 May 2011, it was announced by the Office of Rail Regulation that Merseyrail were fined £85,000 and ordered to pay legal costs of £20,970.15 due to the breach of the Health and Safety at Work etc. Act 1974 leading to this incident.

On 13 March 2021, unit 507006 formed part of a passenger train which overran the buffer stop and derailed at Kirkby railway station. Twelve people sustained minor injuries. This unit was sent to Newport for disposal.

Description

Class 507 units are formed of three cars, and numbered 507001 to 507033. Original plans were drawn up for 47; later 38 Class 507 units to be built, but costs enforced a reduction in the number. Sets are made up of two driving motor cars ('A' DMSO with the compressor; 'B' BDMSO with the battery) and a trailer. Car numbering is as follows:
64367-64399 - DMSO (Driving Motor Second Open)
71342-71374 - TSO (Trailer Second Open)
64405-64437 - BDMSO (Battery Driving Motor Second Open)

Originally, each three-car set seated 234 passengers, this figure being reduced to 222 following interior modifications during the 1990s. After the introduction of high back seats during refurbishment in 2004/2005 this was reduced to 192 with space for cyclists and disabled people improved.

The Class 507 (and 508) replaced LMS-designed Class 502 EMUs on the Northern Line and Class 503 EMUs on the Wirral Line.

Current operations
From new, all Class 507 units have worked the Merseyrail network. Sets have been used interchangeably between the Northern Line and the Wirral Line since 1997, so work the following:

Northern Line
–Hunts Cross line
Ormskirk line
Kirkby line

Wirral Line
New Brighton line
West Kirby line
Chester line
Ellesmere Port line

Fleet details

Livery details

507s have appeared in various colours over their lifetimes.
BR Blue and Grey (1978–1994): the initial livery lasted until well into their careers on Merseyside. The units also carried the MPTE 69 logo and Merseyrail branding on the driver's side of the outer ends of the driving vehicles.
Merseyrail Original (1993–2001; repaints 2001–2004): yellow with white around the windows and black and grey stripes, exclusive to Merseyside EMUs.
Merseyrail Revised (1999–2004): a lighter yellow, and no black stripe.
Merseyrail Refurbished (2003–2015): silver, with vertical curved yellow stripes receding from the cab ends. The passenger doors were all yellow, introduced as a safety measure by Merseyrail. 'M' branding on the front ends and on the sides, and a Merseyrail vinyl. The vinyl was purchased without graffiti protection, and so it does not wear well if vandalised. Several sets ran with their 'M' logos missing or worn away.
Merseyrail Capital of Culture (2008–2009): based around the Merseyrail Refurbished livery, with overlain graphics. Photographs depicted focus on some of the weird and wonderful innovations from Liverpool, such as the SuperLambBanana. The colourful liveries  met with mixed reactions from travellers. It was most often on the Southport – Hunts Cross line. Passenger doors carry diagonal safety stripes.
Merseyrail Hope University (October 2012 –): pale background with text and graphics, advertising Liverpool Hope University. The passenger doors are all yellow, as a safety measure which was introduced, previously, by Merseyrail. The livery is applied as a vinyl skin. This livery is unique to unit number 507002.
Merseyrail Good Communications (January 2014 –): six different designs, half with a yellow background, and half with a brushed metal background, applied with each set having one yellow side and one brushed metal side. Both sides have lifestyle text, in a rounded font, and graphics along a lower railway map-type stubbed stripe. The passenger doors are white on the yellow sides and yellow on the brushed metal sides. There is Merseyrail 'M' branding on each of the passenger doors, as well as on the cab fronts. The livery is applied as a vinyl skin.

Replacement
Merseyrail expected that the Class 507 and 508 units would be withdrawn around 2014 and replaced by a new EMU, but this was  postponed following a refurbishment. In May 2012, Merseytravel announced that it had formally begun a project for replacement. The fleet received a refresh package including external re-livery, internal enhancements and engineering work.

In January 2016, Merseytravel announced the short list of companies bidding to build new trains which will replace the Class 507 and 508 on the Merseyrail network. In December 2016, Merseytravel announced that Stadler had won the £460million contract and that the new  trains would be delivered from summer 2019 with all the old trains replaced by 2021. 
The first unit entered service late in January 2023.

Naming
Named units are as follows:

 507004 - Bob Paisley
 507008 - Harold Wilson
 507009 - Dixie Dean
 507016 - Merseyrail - celebrating the first ten years 2003-2013
 507020 - John Peel
 507021 - Red Rum
 507023 - Operations Inspector Stuart Mason
 507026 - Councillor George Howard
 507033 - Councillor George Howard (Denamed)
 507033 - Councillor Jack Spriggs

References

Sources

Further reading

507
507
Rail transport in Merseyside
Train-related introductions in 1978
600 V DC multiple units
750 V DC multiple units